The 1992–93 Asian Club Championship was the 12th edition of the annual international club football competition held in the AFC region (Asia). It determined that year's club champion of association football in Asia.

PAS Tehran of Iran won the final and become Asian champions for the first time.

Qualifying round

First round

|}

Second round

|}

Third round

|}
No other results from preliminary rounds known

Final round

Group stage

Group A

Group B

Semi-final

Third Place

Final

References
Asian Club Competitions 1993 at RSSSF.com

1992 in Asian football
1993 in Asian football
1992–93